In Greek mythology, Arceophon was a wealthy man of Salamis in Cyprus, son of Minnyrides, a Phoenician.

Mythology 
Arceophon fell in love with Arsinoe, daughter of King Nicocreon of Salamis (a descendant of Teucer), and wooed her, but Nicocreon refused to give his daughter to Arceophon because of the latter's Phoenician descent. Arceophon was upset and began to come to Arsinoe's house by night, hoping to win her heart, but in vain. He then tried to bribe Arsinoe's nurse so that she might arrange for them to meet, but Arsinoe reported this to her parents, who cut off the nurse's tongue, nose and fingers and drove her out of their house. Having lost every hope, Arceophon committed suicide. The fellow citizens grieved at his death and buried him with honors. When Arsinoe leaned out of the window to take a look at the funeral ceremony, Aphrodite turned her into stone. 

The story of Arceophon and Arsinoe is comparable to that of Iphis and Anaxarete.

Note

Reference 
Antoninus Liberalis, The Metamorphoses of Antoninus Liberalis translated by Francis Celoria (Routledge 1992). Online version at the Topos Text Project.

Characters in Greek mythology